The Coimisinéir Teanga (English: Language Commissioner) is an office created by the Acht na dTeangacha Oifigiúla 2003 (English: Official Languages Act) in the Republic of Ireland to promote and safeguard the respective language rights of Irish and English speakers in Ireland. The Coimisinéir is appointed by President of Ireland.

Role
The Coimisinéir's job is mainly to police the articles of the Act, which gives legislative force to the Irish Constitution's definition of Irish as the country's "First Official Language" and English as the "second official language". The Coimisinéir's office develops language plans for public bodies to ensure that they fulfill their responsibilities to speakers of both official languages. Private bodies are not officially included in the Act, as they are under similar legislation in Canada, but the Act makes provisions for extending the Act's applicability in the future.

Commissioners
Seán Ó Cuirreáin, 2004–2014
Rónán Ó Domhnaill, 2014–present

See also
 Office of the Commissioner of Official Languages
 Office québécois de la langue française
 Welsh Language Commissioner
 Māori Language Commission

References

External links
An Coimisinéir Teanga: Official Website

Language regulators
Constitution of Ireland
Department of Tourism, Culture, Arts, Gaeltacht, Sport and Media